Anumeta arabiae is a moth of the family Erebidae first described by Wiltshire in 1961. It is found in Saudi Arabia, Jordan and Israel.

There are probably two generations per year. Adults are on wing from January to February and April.

External links

Image

Toxocampina
Moths of the Middle East
Moths described in 1961